Setaria parviflora is a species of grass known by the common names marsh bristlegrass, knotroot bristle-grass, bristly foxtail and yellow bristlegrass. It is native to North America, including Mexico and the United States from California to the East Coast, Central America and the West Indies, and South America.

This grass is a perennial with small, knotty rhizomes. It produces stems 30 centimeters to well over one meter tall. The leaf blades are up to 25 centimeters long and under a centimeter wide. The leaves are whitish-green. The inflorescence is a compact, spikelike panicle up to 8 or 10 centimeters long. Surrounding each spikelet are up to 12 yellow or purple bristles. The bristles stay on the stalk after the seeds drop away.

This grass grows in moist habitat. It can grow in salty habitat such as salt marshes.

References

parviflora
Flora of North America
Flora of South America